Piranshahr is a city in the Central District of Piranshahr County, West Azerbaijan province, Iran, and serves as capital of the county. At the 2006 census, Piranshahr's population was 57,692 in 12,184 households. The following census in 2011 counted 69,049 people in 16,407 households. The latest census in 2016 showed a population of 91,515 people in 23,468 households. Piranshahr is the center of the traditional region of Mukriyan.

Etymology  

According to the Arab geographer Yaqut al-Hamawi, the name of the city is derived from the famous figure of Shahnameh Piran Viseh Piran is a Turanian figure in Shahnameh, the national epic of Greater Iran. Beside Shahnameh, Piran is also mentioned in other sources such as Tabari and Tha'ālibī. He is the king of Khotan and the spahbed of Afrasiab, the king of Turan. He is described as a wise and intelligent man, seeking to bring peace to Iran and Turan. In old Iranian writings, Piran and Aghrirat are the only Turanians that have been described positively. Piran plays a vital role in the story of Siavash, the story of Kay Khosro and the story of Bizhan and Manizhe. In Persian culture, Piran is a symbol of wisdom. It has been said that Karim Khan called Mohammad Khan Qajar "Piran Viseh". Piran is often compared to Bozorgmehr.

According to Djalal Khaleghi Motlagh, Piran may be the Median Harpagus that saved Cyrus the Great.

Parsua civilization 

The city of Piranshahr is a very ancient settlement. Its locale was the capital of some ancient Aryan civilizations such as Mehr, Parsua and the kingdoms of the Mannaeans.

According to Minorsky, the ancient Parsua is identical with the name of the town Pasveh, which is located in Lajan district (Bakhsh) in Piranshahr. According to Minorsky, The name Persian is connected to the name of Parsua and Pasva and it is believed that the present day Persians (Persian speakers of Iran) dwelled in this district before later migrating to southern and central parts of Iran.

Pasveh is in the vicinity of Piranshahr. Pasva is a village near Piranshahr whose name, according to the Iranist Vladimir Minorsky has existed since the 9th century BC and was built by the "Parsua tribes". It was also mentioned in the records of the Assyrian ruler Shalmaneser III (reign 858-824 BC).

Climate 
Piranshahr's climate is classed under the Köppen climate classification as a humid continental climate (Dsa).

Education
The main institutions of higher education in the area are Payame Noor University and Islamic Azad University. The city is also home to a number of conservatories and art schools.

Demographics
According to Piranshahr's organization for Civil Registration, the highest average annual growth rate in the province is in Piranshahr.

Law and government

The city's chief administrator is the mayor, who is elected by the municipal board of the city. According to Iranian laws the municipal board is periodically elected by the city residents.

Mayor: Kamran Fateh

Governor: Ardavan Nasouti

Friday prayer: Mamousta Mostafa Mahmoudi

Majlis representative: Dr Rassoul Khezri

References

Piranshahr County

Populated places in West Azerbaijan Province

Populated places in Piranshahr County

Cities in West Azerbaijan Province

Iranian Kurdistan

Kurdish settlements in West Azerbaijan Province